USS Hoel (DD-533) was a  built for the United States Navy during World War II. She was named after Lieutenant Commander William R. Hoel. Commissioned in 1943, she was sunk in the Battle off Samar during the Battle of Leyte Gulf on October 25, 1944.

Design and characteristics
The s were designed, beginning in October 1939, to be large enough to adequately carry the armament of the preceding s. From January 1940 to the end of World War II, 175 Fletcher-class destroyers were built.

She was crewed by 273 enlisted men and officers.

Her primary armament consisted of a main battery of five dual-purpose /38 cal. guns, guided by a Mark 37 Gun Fire Control System, ten  torpedo tubes guided by a Mark 27 Torpedo Fire Control System, and six depth charge projectors with two tracks guided by a Mark 27 Depth Charge Fire Control System. Her anti-aircraft battery was made up by ten  Bofors guns and seven  Oerlikon cannons, each guided by a Mark 51 Fire Control System. She was equipped with a QC series sonar.

Construction and service history
Hoel was launched on 19 December 1942 by the Bethlehem Steel Co., San Francisco, California, sponsored by Mrs. Charles Bunker Crane, Jr., granddaughter of the namesake; and commissioned on 29 July 1943.

Hoel sailed from San Francisco Bay 16 August 1943 for shakedown training in operating areas out of San Diego during which she made seven depth charge runs on an underwater sound contact with unknown results. After returning to Mare Island Naval Shipyard 17 September 1943 for final alterations, she cleared San Francisco 26 October 1943 as a part of the screen for a convoy which reached Pearl Harbor 31 October 1943 where Hoel reported to Captain Albert George (A. G.)

Fifth Fleet, which was then preparing to take the Gilbert Islands in Operation Galvanic, assigned Hoel to Rear Admiral Kelly Turner's Northern attack force Task Force 52 (TF 52).

Hoel sortied from Pearl Harbor with her group 10 November 1943 and guarded her "baby flattops" as their aircraft pounded Makin in a dawn preinvasion attack 20 November 1943. For the next three days, torpedo bombers and fighters from Air Support Group 52.3 supported Major General Ralph C. Smith's 27th Infantry Division as it struggled to take Makin. Thousands of bombs and countless rounds from the guns on these aircraft smashed Japanese troop concentrations, gun emplacements, and shore installations on the island. Before dawn 24 November 1943, a torpedo fired by Japanese submarine  struck Liscome Bay amidships and lookouts on the fantail of Coral Sea spotted the wake of a second torpedo which barely missed their ship. Bluejackets on board Hoel saw smoke and flame rise at least a  when the torpedo ripped into Liscome Bay and detonated her bomb magazine. Rear Admiral Henry M. Mullinnix, commander of the Air Support Group, Captain Irving D. Wiltsie and 642 officers and men died with the carrier that sank some 23 minutes later after spewing smoke, flame and redhot aircraft parts for miles around. The groups destroyers rescued 272 survivors. At dusk the following day, 25 November 1943, Japanese aircraft spotted Rear Admiral Turner's task force steaming a few miles off Butaritari Island and dropped both float and parachute flares on each side of his ships to light them up as targets for 13 torpedo bombers which swooped in to attack. Spirited gunnery and well-timed radical simultaneous turns, however, enabled the American vessels to escape without suffering a single hit.

When the escort carriers cleared the area at night 27 November 1943, Hoel joined the screen protecting Abemama Group l which was unloading on Abemama Island. The next morning, Hoel joined Rear Admiral Turner's task force and arrived off Tarawa 1 December 1943 for antisubmarine patrol five miles (8 km) off the lagoon entrance. Captain A. G. Cook, commander of Destroyer Squadron 47 shifted his flag from Hoel to  14 December 1943.

Hoel with fleet units of the 5th Amphibious Force, began intensive training for the invasion of the Marshall Islands. Departed Pearl Harbor 21 January 1944 with the transport screen of Reserve Force, Task Group 51.1 (TG 51.1) which steamed east of Kwajalein while Rear Admiral Turner's Joint Expeditionary Force landed on that atoll 31 January 1944. Hoel escorted the group's transports into Kwajalein Lagoon 2 February 1944, and the following day took station as a radar picket patrol ship south of Kwajalein where she was on call for gunfire support. On 6 February 1944, she accompanied  on a tour of inspection in the Roi-Namur area for Admiral Chester Nimitz.

When Task Forces 51 and 53 dissolved and their ships reverted to Task Force 51, Hoel was assigned to Fire Support Section 3, Task Unit 51.17.3 (TU 51.17.3) of the Eniwetok Expeditionary Group. That afternoon Hoels guns destroyed several small craft on the beach of Parry Island and fired on pillboxes and troop concentrations inland. She then anchored in standby position while the rest of the force bombarded the two islands. The next day, Hoel took her turn at providing harassing fire and at night illuminated the beaches and the reef to prevent enemy troop movements. Just before daybreak 19 February 1944, she took station off Eniwetok for close fire support of the initial landings.

Hoel, in company with three other destroyers of DesRon 47 reported to Commander 3d Fleet at Purvis Bay, Florida Island, 18 March 1944. The next day she cleared that port to join Task Force 39, but 20 March 1944 she was ordered to change course for Emirau Island which was then being occupied by marines. On 25 March 1944,  and  joined Hoel and the rest of DesRon 47 uniting the squadron for the first time.

Hoel then patrolled south and east of Cape Botiangen, New Hanover Island, where her guns destroyed an enemy warehouse 26 March 1944, and, the next day, captured documents which contained valuable information from a  outrigger canoe. That night she made four depth charge runs on an underwater sound contact with unknown results. She returned to Purvis Bay on 8 April 1944 to screen a convoy carrying troops and supplies to Emirau Island.

Upon her return to Purvis Bay 14 April 1944, Hoel reported for duty to Rear Admiral Robert W. Hayler, the commander of Cruiser Division 12 who kept her busy with training exercises and convoy duty until 14 August 1944, when she was assigned to the 3d Amphibious Force then preparing for the invasion of the Palaus. She joined  at Espiritu Santo 24 August 1944, for passage to Purvis Bay. On 8 September 1944 they put to sea for the Palau Islands with Rear Admiral W. D. Sample's escort carrier task force unit to provide air support during the invasion of Peleliu. On 1 October 1944, Hoel made three depth charge runs on an underwater sound contact with unknown results.

Taffy 3
After replenishing at Seeadler Harbor of Manus, Admiralty Islands, Hoel cleared that base with a fire support group 12 October 1944 to join Rear Admiral Thomas L. Sprague's escort carrier group (Task Group 77.4) in invading the Philippines. Sprague's force was composed of three units, each comprising a group of escort carriers and a screen of destroyers and destroyer escorts. These units, known by their radio calls as the "Three Taffys", began operating off Samar 18 October 1944 to cover the landings on Leyte. Hoel was attached to "Taffy 3" (Escort Carrier Task Unit 77.4.3) commanded by Rear Admiral Clifton A. F. Sprague and comprising four escort carriers guarded by destroyers Hoel, Heermann, and Johnston.

Dawn of 25 October 1944 found "Taffy 3" steaming northeast of Samar operating as the Northern Air Support Group. "Taffy 2" was in the central position patrolling off the entrance to Leyte Gulf, and "Taffy 1" covered the southern approaches to the Gulf some 150 miles (240 km) to the southeast of Hoel's "Taffy 3". Rear Admiral Clifton A. F. Sprague was under the erroneous impression that Admiral William Halsey's 3d Fleet was providing protection to the north and so was taken by surprise when at 06:45 "Taffy 3"'s lookouts observed anti-aircraft fire to the northward and within three minutes were under heavy fire from Vice Admiral Takeo Kurita's powerful Center Force of 4 battleships, 6 heavy cruisers, 2 light cruisers, and 11 destroyers.

The only chance for survival of the little group of American "Jeep" carriers and "tin cans" lay in running to the east long enough to launch what aircraft could be readied before fleeing to the south hoping that aid would arrive before their complete destruction. While the carriers launched all available aircraft to attack their numerous Japanese adversaries and then formed a rough circle as they turned toward Leyte Gulf, Hoel and her fellow destroyers Johnston and Heermann, worked feverishly to lay down a smoke screen to hide their "baby flattops" from the overwhelmingly superior enemy ships. At 07:06, when a providential rain squall helped to hide his carriers, Admiral Clifton Sprague boldly ordered his destroyers to attack the Japanese with torpedoes. When she had closed to  she opened fire as she continued her race toward Kongōs  guns. Although Hoels torpedoes all failed to strike their target, they caused Kongō to lose ground in her pursuit of the carriers by forcing her to turn sharply left and to continue to move away from her quarry until they had run their course. Minutes later Hoel suffered hits which knocked out three of her guns, stopped her port engine, and deprived her of her Mark-37 fire control director, FD radar, and Bridge steering control.

When she had closed to within  of the leading ship, identified as  but more likelyYamato, or possibly Haruna. As Hoel came closer and closer to the Japanese ships, Yamato fired at Hoel with her 5-inch guns, while Haruna targeted Hoel with her secondary batteries, and Hoel returned fire, getting into a gun duel with the largest and most powerful battleship ever made. Hoel struck Yamato with a 5 inch shell, and it's unclear if Yamato scored any hits, or if Hoel made any hits on Haruna. The destroyer launched a half-salvo of torpedoes which ran "hot, straight and normal." This time her crew was rewarded by the sight of large columns of water alongside their target, seemingly signifying hits. This observation may have been illusory, as neither Haruna nor Haguro received torpedo damage and explosions may have been near miss bombs from the constant air attacks. Track charts of the battle indicate the most likely target of this attack was actually Kurita's flagship Yamato, which, alongside torpedoes from the Heerman, was forced to turn north to evade these torpedoes, taking Kurita away from the battle at a critical moment and causing him to lose control of his forces, and forcing the Japanese center force's most effective warship, Yamato, out of the battle for an extended period of time.

Hoel now found herself crippled and surrounded by enemies. To make things worse, battleship Yamato, returning from an evasive maneuver, possibly targeted Hoel with her secondary guns (although it is unclear whether Yamato targeted Hoel or Johnston with her 6.1-inch guns). During the next hour the ship rendered her final service by drawing enemy fire to herself and away from the carriers. In the process of fishtailing and chasing salvos she peppered them with her two remaining guns. Finally, at 08:30, after withstanding over 40 hits, an  shell stilled her last working engine. With her engine room under water, her No. 1 magazine ablaze, and the ship listing heavily to port and settling by the stern, Hoels captain, Commander Leon S. Kintberger, ordered his crew to "prepare to abandon ship." The Japanese continued to fire at the doomed ship as her surviving officers and men went over the side and only stopped at 08:55 when Hoel rolled over and sank.

Only 86 of Hoels complement survived; 253 officers and men died with their ship, at least 40 of them dying in the water while awaiting rescue. Commander Kintberger described the courageous devotion to duty of the men of the Hoel in a seaman's epitaph to the action: "Fully cognizant of the inevitable result of engaging such vastly superior forces, these men performed their assigned duties coolly and efficiently until their ship was shot from under them."

Awards 
In addition to the United States Presidential Unit Citation, Hoel received the Philippine Presidential Unit Citation and five battle stars for World War II service.

Notes

References

Books

External links

 USS Hoel-Naval Historical Center
 NavSource.org DD-533
 USS Johnston-Hoel Association

 

Hoel (DD-533)
World War II shipwrecks in the Philippine Sea
Ships built in San Francisco
1942 ships
Hoel (DD-533)
Maritime incidents in October 1944
Shipwrecks of the Philippines